The Central District of Bashagard County is a district (bakhsh) in Bashagard County, Hormozgan Province, Iran. At the 2006 census, its population was 9.322, in 2,131 families.  The District has one city: Sardasht.  The District has two rural districts (dehestan): Jakdan Rural District and Sardasht Rural District.

References 

Districts of Hormozgan Province
Bashagard County